Eugene Field School may refer to the following places:
Eugene Field Elementary School, in Park Ridge, Cook County, Illinois, and Park Ridge-Niles School District 64 
Eugene Field School (Park Hills, Missouri), in St. Francois County and listed on the National Register of Historic Places
Eugene Field School (St. Louis, Missouri), listed on the National Register of Historic Places